Baldia Town lies in the western part of the city with a population of more than 830,000 as per the 2017 census. Baldia Town was formed in 2001 as part of The Local Government Ordinance 2001, and was subdivided into 8 union councils. The town system was disbanded in 2011, and Baldia Town was re-organized as part of Karachi West in 2015.

In 2020, Kemari District was carved out from Karachi West District. So Baldia Town ended up being part of Kemari District.

Location 
It was bordered by SITE Town and Orangi to the east and by Kiamari Town to the north and west, with most of the western boundary formed by part of the RCD Highway.

Neighbourhoods 

 Abidabad
 Turk Colony - Largest Community
 Afridi Colony
 Baldia Colony
 Bismillah Chowk
 Kumhar Colony
 Delhi Colony 
 Dhoraji Colony
 Gujrat Colony 
 Gulshan-e-Ghazi
 Islamnagar
 Ittehad Town
 Kokan Colony
 Muhajir Camp
 Muslim Mujahid Colony
 Nai Abadi
 Naval Colony
 Rasheedabad
 Saeedabad

See also 
Baldia railway station
2012 Pakistan factory fires#Karachi Baldia Town factory
Veraval Turk Jamaat

References

External links 
 Official Karachi website

 

Keamari District
Towns in Karachi